Smiths Creek is a creek located in Sydney, New South Wales, Australia. It is a tributary of Cowan Creek which flows into the Hawkesbury River. Almost all of the catchment lies within Ku-ring-gai Chase National Park.

See also
Coal and Candle Creek
Berowra Creek

Creeks and canals of Sydney